Brecha may refer to:
 Brecha (2009 film), a Spanish film
 Brecha (newspaper), a Uruguayan political and cultural newspaper
 Brecha (street), a street in the Ciudad Vieja, Montevideo
 Brecha de Roldán, Spanish name for a natural gap in the Pyrenees
 La Brecha, a novel by Mercedes Valdivieso
 La Brecha, Sinaloa, a Mexican town